J'accuse is an album by French singer-songwriter Damien Saez released in 2010 on Wagram Music label.

Singles
The track "J'accuse" was released as a first single prior to release of the album and reached #14 in Ultratop 50 Belgian Singles Chart (Wallonia), staying 9 weeks in the singles chart. In French the song was made available as a free download.

A second track, "Pilule" was released as well.

Track listing
"Les Anarchitectures" (“The anarchytectures”) (2:48)
"Pilule" (“Pill”) (5:18)
"Cigarette" (4:13)
"Des p'tits sous" (“Small cash”) (3:58)
"Sonnez tocsin dans les campagnes" (“Ring the tocsin in the countryside”) (4:51)
"J'accuse" (“I accuse”) (4:28)
"Lula" (4:05)
"Regarder les filles pleurer" (“To watch the girls cry”) (5:05)
"Regarder les filles pleurer (thème)" (“To watch the girls cry (Theme)”) (8:47)
"Les Cours des lycées" (“The high[-]schools yards”) (3:56)
"Les Printemps" (“Springs”) (5:14)
"Marguerite" (4:52)
"On a tous une Lula" (“We all have a Lula”) (3:39)
"Tricycle jaune" (“Yellow Tricycle”) (3:46)

Personnel
Damien Saez – vocals, guitar
Thomas Coeuriot – guitar
Cédric Leroux – guitar
Franck Phan – guitar
James Eller – bass
Max Garoute – drums

Charts

References

2010 albums
French-language albums
Damien Saez albums